The Israeli Air Force (IAF; , "Air and Space Arm", commonly known as , Kheil HaAvir, "Air Corps") operates as the aerial warfare branch of the Israel Defense Forces. It was founded on May 28, 1948, shortly after the Israeli Declaration of Independence. , Aluf Tomer Bar has been serving as the Air Force commander.

The Israeli Air Force was established using commandeered or donated civilian aircraft and obsolete and surplus World War II combat aircraft. Eventually, more aircraft were procured, including Boeing B-17s, Bristol Beaufighters, de Havilland Mosquitoes and P-51D Mustangs. The Israeli Air Force played an important part in Operation Kadesh, Israel's part in the 1956 Suez Crisis, dropping paratroopers at the Mitla Pass. On June 5, 1967, the first day of the Six-Day War, the Israeli Air Force performed Operation Focus, debilitating the opposing Arab air forces and attaining air supremacy for the remainder of the war. Shortly after the end of the Six-Day War, Egypt initiated the War of Attrition, and the Israeli Air Force performed repeated bombings of strategic targets deep within enemy territory. When the Yom Kippur War broke out on October 6, 1973, Egyptian and Syrian advances forced the IAF to abandon detailed plans for the destruction of enemy air defences. Forced to operate under the missile and anti-aircraft artillery threats, the close air support it provided allowed Israeli troops on the ground to stem the tide and eventually go on the offensive.

Since that war most of Israel's military aircraft have been obtained from the United States. Among these are the A-4 Skyhawk, F-4 Phantom II, F-15 Eagle, F-16 Fighting Falcon and F-35 Lightning II. The Israeli Air Force has also operated a number of domestically produced types such as the IAI Nesher, and later, the more advanced IAI Kfir. On June 7, 1981, eight IAF F-16s covered by six F-15s carried out Operation Opera to destroy the Iraqi nuclear facilities at Osiraq. On June 9, 1982, the Israeli Air Force carried out Operation Mole Cricket 19, crippling Syrian air defences in Lebanon. On October 1, 1985, In response to a PLO terrorist attack which murdered three Israeli civilians in Cyprus, the Israeli air force carried out Operation Wooden Leg, bombing the PLO Headquarters in Tunis. In 1991, the IAF carried out Operation Solomon which brought Ethiopian Jews to Israel. In 1993 and 1996, the IAF participated in Operation Accountability and Operation Grapes of Wrath, respectively. It has taken part in many operations since, including the 2006 Lebanon War, Operation Cast Lead, Operation Pillar of Cloud, Operation Protective Edge and Operation Guardian of the Walls. On September 6, 2007, the Israeli Air Force successfully bombed an alleged Syrian nuclear reactor in Operation Orchard.

Mission statement
The Israeli Air Force states the following as its functions:
 To protect the State of Israel from aerial attack and to defend the IDF's zone of operations
 To achieve air supremacy throughout the IDF's zone of operation
 To participate in the fighting on both ground and sea
 To hit targets deep in enemy territory
 To create the aerial intelligence picture and participate in the creation of the general intelligence picture and its assessment
 To transport troops, equipment and weapons systems
 To carry out search, rescue and aerial evacuation missions
 To execute special operations
 To continually build and improve itself, as part of the general plan for improving the IDF and in accordance with the authority vested in it

Insignia
The insignia / roundel of the Israeli Air Force consists of a blue Star of David on a white circle. Aircraft usually carry it painted in six positions – on the top and bottom of each wing, and on each side of the fuselage. A low-visibility variant – a blue Star of David without the white circle – also exists, although its use is extremely rare. Squadron markings usually go on the tail fin.

History

Early years (1948–1967)

Forerunners of the Israeli Air Force were the Palestine Flying Service established by the Irgun in 1937, and Sherut Avir, the air wing of the Haganah. The Israeli Air Force formed on May 28, 1948, shortly after Israel declared statehood and found itself under attack. The force consisted of a hodge-podge of commandeered or donated civilian aircraft converted to military use. A variety of obsolete and surplus ex-World War II combat-aircraft were quickly sourced by various means to supplement this fleet. The backbone of the IAF consisted of 25 Avia S-199s (purchased from Czechoslovakia, essentially Czechoslovak-built Messerschmitt Bf 109s), and 60 Supermarine Spitfire LF Mk IXEs, the first of which, "Israel 1", was locally assembled from British abandoned spare parts and a salvaged engine from an Egyptian Air Force Spitfire with most of the rest purchased from Czechoslovakia.
Creativity and resourcefulness were the foundations of early Israeli military success in the air, rather than technology (which, at the inception of the IAF, was generally inferior to that used by Israel's adversaries). The majority, 15 out of the first 18 pilots in 101 Squadron (Israel), of the IAF's first military-grade pilots in 1948 were foreign volunteers (both Jewish and non-Jewish), mainly World War II veterans who wanted to collaborate with Israel's struggle for independence, with the rest of the military-grade pilots being Israeli WWII veterans, whereas pilots from Sherut Avir were mainly locals who flew light civilian aircraft for supply, reconnaissance, and makeshift ground attack with hand-thrown light bombs and hand fired light machine guns.

Israel's new fighter-arm first went into action on May 29, 1948, assisting efforts to halt the Egyptian advance from Gaza northwards. Four newly arrived Avia S-199s, flown by Lou Lenart, Modi Alon, Ezer Weizman and Eddie Cohen, struck Egyptian forces near Ashdod. Although damage to the enemy was minimal, two aircraft were lost and Cohen killed, nevertheless the attack achieved its goal and stopped the Egyptians.

After un-assembled planes were strafed on the ground on May 30 at Ekron airfield the fighters were moved to makeshift strip located around the current Herzliya Airport. The airfield was used as it was a bit back from the front-lines, and was clandestine since it was a purpose built strip, that was constructed after the beginning of hostilities, in between the orange orchards around Herzliya, and did not appear on published maps. The Israeli Air Force scored its first aerial victories on June 3 when Modi Alon, flying Avia D.112, shot down two Egyptian Air Force DC-3s which had just bombed Tel Aviv. The first dogfight against enemy fighters took place a few days later, on June 8, when Gideon Lichtaman shot down an Egyptian Spitfire. During these initial operations, the squadron operated with a few planes versus an almost complete Arab theater air supremacy and the airplanes were parked dispersed between the orange trees. The fighters were moved in October to Hatzor Airbase from the Herzliya strip due to its unsuitability in rainy conditions, probable loss of clandestine status, moving front lines which made former British bases safe for use, and a shift in the balance of air superiority towards the Israelis.

As the war progressed Israel procured more and more aircraft, including Boeing B-17s, Bristol Beaufighters, de Havilland Mosquitoes and P-51D Mustangs, leading to a shift in the balance of power.

Suez Crisis (1956)
The Israeli Air Force played an important part in Operation Kadesh, Israel's part in the 1956 Suez Crisis. At the launch of the operation, on October 29, Israeli P-51D Mustangs, some using their propeller blades, severed telephone lines in the Sinai, while 16 IAF DC-3s – escorted by fighters – dropped Israeli paratroopers behind Egyptian lines at the Mitla Pass and Et-Tur. The Israeli Air Force also conducted attacks on Egyptian ground units and assisted the Israeli Navy in capturing the Egyptian Navy destroyer Ibrahim el Awal, which had bombarded the Israeli city of Haifa – an airstrike damaged the Egyptian ship's engines, enabling Israeli ships to reach it and capture it.

Six-Day War (1967)
In three hours on the morning of June 5, 1967, the first day of the Six-Day War, the Israeli Air Force executed Operation Focus, crippling the opposing Arab air forces and attaining air supremacy for the remainder of the war. In a surprise attack, the IAF destroyed most of the Egyptian Air Force while its planes were still on the ground. By the end of the day, with surrounding Arab countries also drawn into the fighting, the IAF had mauled the Syrian and Jordanian air forces as well, striking as far as Iraq. After six days of fighting Israel claimed a total of 452 Arab aircraft destroyed, of which 49 were aerial victories.

After the IAF's impressive performance in the Six-Day War, the Lyndon Johnson administration decided to sell F-4 Phantom fighters to Israel in 1968, marking the first sale of American military equipment to Israel.

War of Attrition
Shortly after the end of the Six-Day War, Egypt initiated the War of Attrition, hoping to prevent Israel from consolidating its hold over the lands captured in 1967. Israel's goal in the fighting was to exact heavy losses on the opposing side, in order to facilitate a ceasefire. The Israeli Air Force consequently undertook repeated bombings of strategic targets deep within enemy territory and repeatedly challenged Arab air forces for aerial supremacy, all the while supporting operations by Israel's ground and naval forces. In late 1969 the Soviet Union began to deploy fighter aircraft units and surface-to-air missile units to Egypt. The Soviet surface-to-air missile units soon joined their Egyptian allies in direct confrontations with Israeli aircraft. Soviet fighters conducted patrols but Israeli pilots were ordered not to engage them. However, on July 30, 1970, the tension peaked: An IAF ambush resulted in a large scale air brawl between IAF planes and MiGs flown by Soviet pilots—five MiGs were shot down, while the IAF suffered no losses. Fear of further escalation and superpower involvement brought the war to a conclusion. By the end of August 1970, the Israeli Air Force had claimed 111 aerial kills while reporting losing only four aircraft to Arab fighters. Egyptian and Soviet forces claimed to shoot down approximately 20 Israeli Air Force planes with surface-to-air missile and anti-aircraft artillery units.

Yom Kippur War (1973) 

On October 6, 1973, with war imminent, the IAF began preparing for a pre-emptive strike against Egyptian and Syrian airfields and anti-aircraft positions. The Israeli government, however, decided against pre-emption. IAF aircraft were therefore in the process of re-armament to the air-to-air role when Yom Kippur War hostilities began at 14:00. The next morning begun with Operation Tagar, a SEAD offensive against Egyptian air defences, beginning with strikes against Egyptian air bases. Tagar, however, was quickly discontinued when the dire situation on the Golan Heights became apparent. IAF efforts were redirected north, where the ill-fated Operation Model 5 was carried out. Flying with outdated intelligence and no electronic screening against mobile SAM batteries and heavy flak, 6 IAF Phantoms were lost. The sustained campaign required to defeat enemy air defences was abandoned in the face of Egyptian and Syrian advances and the IAF was forced to operate under the SAM threat. Nevertheless, the close air support it provided allowed Israeli troops on the ground to stem the tide and eventually go on the offensive, first in the north and later in the south.

After the failure of the Israeli counter-offensive in the Sinai on October 8, the southern front remained relatively static and the IAF focused its attention on the Syrian front. While A-4 Skyhawks provided much needed support to troops on the ground, at the cost of 31 aircraft by the end of fourth day of the war, IAF Phantoms repeatedly struck Syrian air fields. Following Syrian FROG-7 strikes on military and civilian targets in northern Israel, the IAF also initiated a campaign to destroy the infrastructure on which Syria's war-making capacity depended, targeting strategic targets in Syria such as its oil industry and electricity generating system. By October 13 the Syrians had been pushed back and beyond their initial lines, Damascus had come within range of Israeli artillery and an Iraqi armored brigade, the vanguard of its expeditionary force, was destroyed.

On October 14 the Egyptian army launched an offensive along the entire front, but was repulsed by the IDF. Israel followed on this success by attacking at the seam between the 2nd and 3rd Egyptian armies and crossing the Suez Canal into Egypt. Israeli forces fanned north and south, destroying Egyptian rear units and punching holes through its air defence array. This allowed the IAF the freedom of action it was previously denied and renewed attacks led to the collapse of the Egyptian Air Defence Force. This prompted increased diplomatic activity to resolve the war, coupled with increased activity by the Egyptian Air Force. From about October 18 to the end of the war, intensive air battles took place between Israeli and Egyptian aircraft.

Official Israeli Air Force losses of the Yom Kippur War number at 102 aircraft, including 32 F-4 Phantoms, 53 A-4 Skyhawks, 11 Dassault Mirages, and 6 IAI Sa'ars, although other accounts suggest as many as 128 Israeli aircraft were lost. 91 air force personnel, of which 53 were airmen, were killed. 172 Egyptian aircraft were shot down in air-to-air combat, for a loss of between 5 and 21 for the Israelis (on all fronts). No official numbers were released on the Arab side, though total Egyptian losses were between 235 and 242 aircraft, while Syria lost between 135 and 179.

Expansion (1973–1982)
Since the war most of Israel's military aircraft have been obtained from the United States. Among these are the F-4 Phantom II, A-4 Skyhawk, F-15 Eagle and F-16 Fighting Falcon. The Israeli Air Force has also operated a number of domestically produced types such as the IAI Nesher, and later, the more advanced IAI Kfir, which were derivatives of the French Dassault Mirage 5. The Kfir was adapted to utilize a more powerful U.S. engine, produced under license in Israel. On July 4, 1976, four Israeli C-130 Hercules transport aircraft secretly flew to Entebbe Airport for a rescue operation. In March 1978, the Israeli Air Force participated in Operation Litani.

On June 7, 1981, eight IAF F-16A fighters covered by six F-15A jets carried out Operation Opera to destroy the Iraqi nuclear facilities at Osiraq. Among the pilots who took part in the attack was Ilan Ramon, later Israel's first astronaut.

1982 Lebanon War and aftermath

Prior to the 1982 Lebanon War, Syria, with the help of the Soviet Union, had built up an overlapping network of surface-to-air missiles in Lebanon's Beqaa Valley. On June 9, 1982, the Israeli Air Force carried out Operation Mole Cricket 19, crippling the Syrian air defence array. In subsequent aerial battles against the Syrian Air Force, the IAF managed to shoot down 86 Syrian aircraft without losing a single fighter plane in an air-to-air combat. IAF AH-1 Cobra helicopter gunships destroyed dozens of Syrian armored fighting vehicles and other ground targets, including some T-72 main battle tanks.

For many years after the war's official end, and throughout Israeli presence in Lebanon, the IAF continued to mount attacks on Hezbollah and PLO positions in south Lebanon. On October 1, 1985, In response to a PLO terrorist attack which murdered three Israeli civilians in Cyprus, the Israeli air force carried out Operation Wooden Leg. The strike involved the bombing of PLO Headquarters in Tunis, by F-15 Eagles. This was the longest combat mission ever undertaken by the IAF, a stretch of 2,300 kilometers, involving in-flight refueling by an IAF Boeing 707. As a result, PLO headquarters and barracks were either destroyed or damaged.

1990s and beyond

Many of the IAF's electronics and weapons systems are developed and built in Israel by Israel Military Industries, Israel Aerospace Industries, Elbit, and others. Since the 1990s, the IAF has upgraded most of its aircraft with advanced Israeli-made systems, improving their performances. In 1990 the IAF began receiving the AH-64 Apache helicopter gunship and started equipping its aircraft with the Rafael Python 4, Popeye, and Derby missiles.
 
During the first Gulf War of 1991, Israel was attacked by Iraqi Scud missiles. Israeli Air Force pilots were on constant stand-by in their cockpits throughout the conflict, ready to fly to Iraq to retaliate. Diplomatic pressure as well as denial of IFF transponder codes from the United States, however, kept the IAF grounded while Coalition air assets and Patriot missile batteries supplied by the US and the Netherlands sought to deal with the Scuds.

In 1991, the IAF carried out Operation Solomon which brought Ethiopian Jews to Israel. In 1993 and 1996, the IAF participated in Operation Accountability and Operation Grapes of Wrath, respectively.

In the late 1990s, the IAF began acquiring the F-15I Ra'am (Thunder) and the F-16I Sufa (Storm), manufactured specially for Israel according to IAF requirements. The first of 102 F-16I Sufas arrived in April 2004 joining an F-16 fleet that had already been the largest outside the US Air Force. The IAF also purchased the advanced Israeli air-to-air missile Rafael Python 5, with full-sphere capability, as well as a special version of the Apache Longbow, designated AH-64DI or Saraph. In 2005 the Israeli Air Force received modified Gulfstream V jets ("Nachshon"), equipped with advanced intelligence systems made by Israel Military Industries. By 2013 Israel became the world's largest exporter of drones. In December 2016, Israel received its first pair of F-35 Lightning II from the United States.

Three months after the assassination of the leader of Hizbullah, Abbas al-Musawi, the IAF launched an offensive across South Lebanon with five air raids in six days. Some of the targets struck were as far north as Baalbek. On the final day, 26 May 1992, there were more than 40 missile strikes. Over 20 civilians were killed during the attacks.

The Israeli Air Force took an extensive part in IDF operations during the al-Aqsa Intifada, including the controversial targeted killings of Palestinian terrorist leaders, most notably Salah Shakhade, Ahmed Yassin and Abed al-Aziz Rantissi. While this policy was criticized due to the collateral damage caused in certain instances, Israel claims it is vital in its fight against terrorism and that IAF pilots do whatever they can to avoid civilian casualties, including aborting strikes. In 2007, Israel achieved a civilian casualty ratio of 1:30, or one civilian casualty for every thirty combatant casualties, in its airstrikes on militants in the Palestinian territories. Alan Dershowitz noted that "No army in history has ever had a better ratio of combatants to civilians killed in a comparable setting".

On October 5, 2003, the Israeli Air Force attacked an alleged Palestinian militant training camp in Ain es Saheb, Syria. A reaction to an earlier suicide bombing in Haifa, this was the first overt Israeli military operation in Syria since the 1973 Yom Kippur War.

2006 Lebanon War
The IAF played a critical role in the 2006 Lebanon War. IAF strikes—mainly, though not exclusively, in southern Lebanon—were aimed at stopping rocket launches by Hezbollah's militia targeting Israeli towns. The IAF flew more than 12,000 combat missions during this war. The most notable, taking place during the second day of the war, resulted in the IAF destroying 59 Iranian-supplied medium- and long-range missile launchers in just 34 minutes. Widespread condemnation followed the July 30 IAF airstrike on a building suspected to be a militant hideout near the village of Qana, in which 28 civilians were killed. Hezbollah shot down an IAF CH-53 Yas'ur helicopter on the last day of the war, killing five crew members. Israeli aircraft also shot down three of Hezbollah's Iranian-made aerial drones during the conflict.

2007 Operation Outside the Box

In the 2007 Operation Outside the Box, the Israeli Air Force attacked a suspected Syrian nuclear weapons site. The IAF used electronic warfare (EW) system to take neutralize Syria's air defenses, feeding them a false sky-picture while IAF jets crossed much of Syria, bombed their targets and returned to Israel unchallenged.

Against Hamas
Since Hamas' takeover of Gaza in 2007, the Israeli Air Force has taken part in repeated bouts of violence between Israel and the Hamas-held Gaza Strip. In December 2008, the IAF spearheaded Operation Cast Lead, carrying out more than 2,360 air strikes. It had a principal role in destroying Hamas targets, and killed several senior Hamas commanders, including Said Seyam, Nizar Rayan, Tawfik Jaber, and Abu Zakaria al-Jamal.

According to a CBS news report, in January 2009 Israeli planes struck a convoy of trucks in Sudan headed for Egypt and carrying weapons apparently meant for the Gaza Strip. Seventeen trucks were bombed and thirty-nine smugglers were killed in the strike. On April 5, 2011, a car driving from Port Sudan Airport to Port Sudan was destroyed by a missile. Both passengers were killed. one of whom may have been a senior Hamas military commander. The Sudanese Foreign Minister blamed the attack on Israel. Sudanese newspapers reported that Israeli aircraft attacked Gaza-bound arms convoys again in late 2011. On October 24, 2012, Sudan claimed that Israel had bombed a munitions factory south of Khartoum.

The Israeli Air Force also operates surface-to-air missile and anti-aircraft artillery units. Since 1990 their primary role has been the interception of surface-to-surface missiles and rockets fired into Israel. In 2011 the IAF began operating the 'Iron Dome' anti-rocket missile system, which within a year had successfully intercepted and destroyed 93 rockets fired at Israeli towns from Gaza.

In November 2012, the IAF participated in Operation Pillar of Defense, during which, according to the IDF Spokesperson, Israeli forces targeted more than 1,500 military sites in Gaza Strip, including rocket launching pads, smuggling tunnels, command centers, and weapons manufacturing and storage facilities. Many of these attacks were carried out by the Air Force.

Between July 8 and August 5, 2014, the IAF participated in Operation Protective Edge, during which, according to the IDF Spokesperson, Israeli forces targeted 4,762 terror sites across the Gaza Strip, including rocket launching sites, command and control centers, military administration facilities, weapons storage and manufacturing facilities and training and military compounds.

In May 2021, Israeli artillery and air force carried out 1,500 strikes on Gaza during Operation Guardian of the Walls.

Incidents during the Syrian Civil War

The civil war raging within Israel's northern neighbor, has occasionally witnessed activity by the IAF, some overt, some unacknowledged and some merely attributed. Notable actions include:
 The downing of a Syrian Air Force Sukhoi Su-24 on 23 September 2014: The aircraft was shot down by an IAF MIM-104 Patriot air defense battery, after allegedly crossing the Syrian-Israeli ceasefire line during a ground attack mission against Syrian opposition forces.
 On 20 and 21 August 2015, after four rockets hit the Golan Heights and Upper Galilee, Israel launched airstrikes in Syria, killing several militants.
 The March 2017 Israeli airstrikes in Syria: On March 17, 2017, Israeli jet fighters attacked targets in Syria. Several S-200 missiles were fired at the jets, and one missile was shot down by an Arrow 2 missile; no aircraft were damaged. The incident was the first clearly confirmed Israeli strike on Syrian territory during the Syrian Civil War.
 On 10 February 2018, an Israeli AH-64 shot down an Iranian drone that entered Israel. 4 Israeli F-16's launched a strike into Syria while remaining in Israeli airspace, reportedly to strike Iranian drone control facilities, conducting a cross-border raid. One of the F-16s was shot down by Syrian surface to air missiles and crashed in northern Israel, the first Israeli jet to be shot down in combat since 1982. Both pilots managed to eject in Israeli territory. The pilots were injured, but walked out of hospital around a week later. Israel subsequently attacked Syrian air defenses and Iranian targets.
 On May 10, 2018, after Iranian elite forces on the Syrian-held side of the Golan Heights fired around 20 rockets towards Israeli army positions without causing damages or injuries, Israel responded with rounds of rocket fire into Syria. The Israeli Air Force confirmed the strikes. Twenty-three fighters, among them 18 foreigners, were killed. IAF commander Amikam Norkin said Israel used its F-35 stealth fighters for the first time.
 On September 17, 2018, Syrian media reported several explosions over the city of Latakia after allegedly intercepting missiles fired from the Mediterranean Sea. Israel assumed responsibility for the attack on Latakia, following the shoot down of a Russian reconnaissance plane by Syrian air defense systems. SANA news agency claimed ten people were injured by the Israeli attack. The Syrian Observatory for Human Rights reported two Syrian soldiers died, while 113 Iranian soldiers have been killed during the past month as a result of Israeli strikes in Syria.

Organization

Administrative organization

Chief of Air Staff Group
Fixed Wing Group
Helicopter Group
Intelligence Group

Equipment Group

Manpower Group
Chief Medical Officer

Unit Control Group
Air Special Forces Group
Shaldag – air force special operations unit
Unit 669 – medevac extraction unit
Air Defense Command
Northern Air Defense Regiment
Central Air Defense Regiment
Southern Air Defense Regiment (including Air Defense School)

Operational organization 

Ramat David Airbase (Wing 1)
101 "First Fighter" Squadron
105 "Scorpion" Squadron
109 "Valley" Squadron
193 "Defenders of the West" Squadron
Sdot Micha Airbase (Wing 2)
150 Squadron
199 Squadron
248 Squadron
 Hatzor Airbase (Wing 4)
100 "Flying Camel" Squadron
Hatzerim Airbase (Air Force Base 6)
69 "Hammers" Squadron
102 "Flying Tiger" Squadron
IAF Aerobatic Team
107 "Knights of the Orange Tail" Squadron
Air Force Infantry School
Tel Nof Airbase (Air Force Base 8)
106 "Spearhead" Squadron
114 "Night Leaders" Squadron
118 "Night Riders" Squadron
133 "Knight of the Twin Tail" Squadron
210 "White Eagle" Squadron
601 Squadron (Flight Test Center)
Unit 555 "Sky Crows" (electronic warfare unit)
Ovda Airbase (Air Force Base 10)
115 "Flying Dragon" Squadron
 Aviation Professions School
 Air Force Officers School
Haifa Airbase (Air Force Base 21)
Technical Professions School
IAF Technological College
Ramon Airbase (Wing 25)
113 "Hornet" Squadron
119 "Bat" Squadron
190 "Magic Touch" Squadron
201 "The One" Squadron
253 "Negev" Squadron
Nevatim Airbase (Air Force Base 28)
103 "Elephants" Squadron
116 "Lions of the South" Squadron
117 "First Jet" Squadron
120 "Desert Giants" Squadron
122 "Nahshon" Squadron
131 "Knights of the Yellow Bird" Squadron
140 "Golden Eagle" Squadron
Palmachim Airbase (Air Force Base 30)
123 "Desert Birds" Squadron
124 "Rolling Sword" Squadron
151 Squadron (Missile Testing Squadron)
161 "Black Snake" Squadron
166 "Spark" Squadron
200 "First UAV" Squadron

Aircraft

Current inventory

Historic

Munitions and space systems

Pilot selection and training

Thirty nine Israeli pilots have been credited with ace status, having shot down at least 5 enemy aircraft. Of these, 10 have shot down at least eight jet planes. The top ranking Israeli ace is Colonel Giora Epstein, who shot down seventeen enemy planes. Epstein holds the world record for jet aircraft shot down, and the most aircraft of any type shot down since the Korean War.

Israel Defence Forces had until 1995 denied women the opportunity to become pilots. In 1995, civilian pilot and aeronautical engineer Alice Miller successfully petitioned the Israel High Court of Justice to take the Israeli Air Force pilot training exams, after being rejected on grounds of gender. The court in 1996 eventually ruled that the IAF could not exclude qualified women from pilot training. Even though Miller would not pass the exams, the ruling was a watershed, opening doors for women in new IDF roles. After the prohibition had been lifted, the first female graduate was F-16 navigator "Shari" in 1998, followed three years later by Roni Zuckerman, the first female jet fighter pilot in IAF history.

Ranks
IAF ranks are identical to other Israel Defense Forces ranks; the rank insignia are identical except for the use of silver against a dark blue background. The service's most senior-ranking active officer is the air force commander, which is the billet of a major general (aluf), and reports directly to the IDF Chief of Staff.

Officers

Enlisted

List of IAF commanders

See also
Lists of flying aces in Arab–Israeli wars
Nuclear weapons and Israel
Post–World War II air-to-air combat losses
Talpiot program

References

Citations

Bibliography

Further reading
 Amir, Amos. Brig Gen. Fire in the Sky : Flying in Defence of Israel. Pen & Sword Aviation (2005). 
 Aloni, Shlomo. "The Last of the Wooden Wonders: The DH Mosquito in Israeli Service". Air Enthusiast, No. 83, September–October 1999, pp. 30–51. 
 Cull, Brian and Aloni, Shlomo, with Nicolle, David. Spitfires Over Israel. Grubb Street (1994). 
 Cull, Brian and Aloni, Shlomo, with Nicolle, David. Wings Over Suez. Grubb Street (1996). 
 Romm, Giora. Major Gen. Solitary: The Crash, Captivity and Comeback of an Ace Fighter Pilot. Black Irish (2014). 
 Spector, Iftach. Brig Gen. Loud and Clear : The Memoir of an Israeli Fighter Pilot. Zenith Press (2009).

External links

 

 
1948 establishments in Israel
Military units and formations established in 1948